The Seduction is a 1982 American thriller film written and directed by David Schmoeller, and starring Morgan Fairchild, Michael Sarrazin, Vince Edwards, and Andrew Stevens. Its plot follows a Los Angeles news anchor who is aggressively pursued by an obsessive male stalker. The original music score was composed by Lalo Schifrin. Reviews for the film have mainly been negative which resulted in three Razzie nominations, including two for Fairchild.

Plot
Jamie Douglas is a beautiful, successful news writer and anchor in Los Angeles, in a stable relationship with her long-term boyfriend, Brandon. Jamie begins receiving anonymous phone calls and flowers from a man named Derek, a psychotic photographer who is obsessed with her. Initially, Jamie dismisses them as harmless flattery from an "admirer," until Derek retrieves her phone number and begins calling her house in the Hollywood Hills, as well as that of her neighbor, a fashion model named Robin. Derek manages to access Jamie's dressing room at the office, and gives her a box of candy, apologizing for his pestering calls. Jamie is sympathetic toward him, and thanks him for the gift.

Derek continues to obsessively stalk Jamie, who is unaware that his home is adjacent to her property. One afternoon he accosts her in her living room, maniacally photographing her as she fends him off. Brandon arrives and stops the attack, beating Derek significantly. Bloodied, Derek thanks Jamie, and leaves. Jamie visits Maxwell, a police officer friend, seeking advice. Maxwell explains that Jamie has few options, as Derek has technically not committed any crimes. Meanwhile, Derek follows Robin to one of her modeling jobs. He introduces himself as a friend of Jamie's, but Robin realizes he is the man who has been calling her and Jamie's homes. Derek pleads for Robin to convince Jamie to go on a date with him, but Robin forces him out.

Later, Derek confronts Jamie and Robin at the mall, where Jamie sternly tells him she despises him, and to leave her alone. Brandon consults a doctor about Jamie's situation, and the doctor advises him that Derek likely suffers from erotomania, a delusional disorder in which he believes his affections for Jamie, a stranger, are reciprocated. One night, Derek breaks into Jamie's house and watches her from her bedroom closet, fondling himself while she takes a bath. After realizing Derek is in the house, she retrieves Brandon, but Derek flees through a window and escapes. Later, one of Derek's coworkers at the photo studio, Julie, attempts to ask him on a date. He politely declines, telling her he is engaged to be married.

As part of a news story, Jamie attends a funeral for a female victim of an unknown serial killer, dubbed the "Sweetheart Killer." While reviewing the footage, Jamie notices Derek standing behind her in the cemetery. Derek breaches the news station posing as a newsrunner, and brings a "last-minute addition" for Jamie's broadcast. During the live taping, a message from Derek runs on Jamie's teleprompter. Distraught, Jamie pleads on air for help, telling her viewers that she has a stalker who is going to kill her. That night, Brandon comforts Jamie, and the two relax in her hot tub. The two begin to have sex, but Derek emerges from the shadows and stabs Brandon to death. Jamie flees into the house to phone police, but is put on hold. Meanwhile, Derek buries Brandon's body in his yard.

Dejected and at a loss for what to do, Jamie phones Derek at his home, begging him to come back. When he returns to the house, she begins firing at him with a shotgun, and he crashes through a window to escape. Jamie phones Derek again, and tauntingly offers herself to him. Meanwhile, Julie arrives at Derek's to warn him that the police questioned her about him; during their conversation, Maxwell arrives at Derek's home and warns him to leave Jamie alone, stating that in exchange he will keep him from going to jail for harassment. After Maxwell leaves, Julie professes her love to Derek, but he grows enraged when she tells him Jamie does not love him. Julie storms out to her car, and notices Derek sneaking into Jamie's backyard moments later. Derek enters the house and threatens Jamie with a knife. She manages to force him off her, and the two fight in her bedroom. Derek wrests her to the bed, and begins attempting to rape her. In response, Jamie begins to aggressively offer herself to him, unbuttoning his shirt and pants, but he quickly shows cowardice, unwittingly revealing he is impotent. Disgusted at Derek's hypocrisy, Jamie attempts to leave, until an enraged Derek attacks her and prepares to kill her, only to be shot dead by Julie, who stumbles in on the scene.

Cast
 Morgan Fairchild as Jamie Douglas
 Michael Sarrazin as Brandon
 Vince Edwards as Maxwell
 Andrew Stevens as Derek Sanford
 Colleen Camp as Robin Dunlap
 Kevin Brophy as Bobby
 Betty Kean as Mrs. Caluso
 Wendy Smith Howard as Julie
 Joanne Linville as Dr. Weston
 Marri Mak as Lisa

Production

Screenplay
The Seduction was written and directed by David Schmoeller, who had previously directed the slasher film Tourist Trap (1979). Irwin Yablans served as a co-producer alongside Bruce Cohn Curtis, marking their third producing collaboration after Roller Boogie (1979) and Hell Night (1981). According to Fairchild, Schmoeller's screenplay was partly inspired by a real stalking case revolving around a Los Angeles newscaster who was harassed by an obsessed viewer.

Filming
Filming took place in Los Angeles over a period of seven weeks in the spring of 1981. Producer Yablans had hoped to complete production before the June 30 expiry of the Directors Guild of America contract. The shoot was met by several protests when Yablans hired an exclusively non-union crew. Frank Capra Jr. served as an executive producer on the film.

Music
Dionne Warwick sings the theme song over the opening titles.

Release

Box office
The Seduction premiered in Atlantic City, New Jersey on January 16, 1982. It had its Los Angeles opening the following week on January 22, before opening in New York City on February 26. It opened number 6 at the U.S. box office, and eventually went on to gross a domestic total of $11.4 million.

Critical response
Jon Marlowe of The Miami News compared the film unfavorably to several contemporary stalker-themed films, including Lipstick (1976) and The Fan (1981). Vincent Canby of The New York Times deemed the film "an often comically inept, unsuccessfully vicious nonthriller." Jack Mathews of the Detroit Free Press wrote in his one-star review, "I'll be blunt. Would you pay $4 to see Morgan Fairchild naked? There's no other reason to invest in this laughably implausible thriller (...) Well, would you pay $5?"

The film was nominated for a total of three Golden Raspberry Awards, including two for Fairchild (for Worst Actress and Worst New Star), and Camp (for Worst Supporting Actress).

Home media
Anchor Bay Entertainment released The Seduction on DVD in November 2006. Scream Factory released the film on Blu-ray for the first time on May 21, 2019.

References

External links
 
 
 

1982 films
1980s erotic thriller films
1982 independent films
American independent films
American erotic thriller films
Embassy Pictures films
Films about stalking
Films set in Los Angeles
Films shot in Los Angeles
Films scored by Lalo Schifrin
Films directed by David Schmoeller
Films produced by Irwin Yablans
Films with screenplays by David Schmoeller
1980s English-language films
1980s American films